Huequi is a stratovolcano located in Los Lagos Region of Chile. It lies at the centre of Ayacara Peninsula and close to the Gulf of Ancud.

See also 
 List of volcanoes in Chile
 Huinay
 Pumalín Park
 Chaitén

References 
 

Mountains of Chile
Stratovolcanoes of Chile
Volcanoes of Los Lagos Region